Hashem El Madani (1928 – 8 August 2017) was a Lebanese photographer. During his 50-year career he produced over 75,000 images and photographed 90% of Sidon's inhabitants.

Madani was born in Sidon to a father from Madina, Saudi Arabia, who was sent to Sidon as a representative of the Islamic Awqaf. Madani opened his photography studio, Studio Shehrazade, in 1953.

References 

1928 births
2017 deaths
Lebanese photographers
People from Sidon